, abbreviated as , is the regionally prestigious prefectural high school in Koriyama city, Fukushima, Japan. It was founded on September 11, 1884, originally as Fukushima Junior High School. After being renamed Asaka Junior High School in 1948, it was changed into a high school due to the restructure of the Japanese education system on April 1, 1948.

History
Asaka High School was a boys' school for a long time, but has recently become coeducational. Simultaneously, it abolished its rule mandating school uniforms.

The old building, which had been formerly used as the main building of former Fukushima ordinary junior high school , is conserved in the front of its site, as the Asaka history museum. It was designated a cultural heritage site in 1977. The museum was deemed unsafe to enter after the 2011 Tōhoku earthquake and tsunami.

Asaka High School has promoted the themes "Frontier Spirit", "Literary and Military arts", and "Spartan".

It has a rivalry with Fukushima High School and Iwaki High School.

Notable alumni
 Hiroyuki Arai
 Kwan-Ichi Asakawa
 Kōichirō Gemba
 Toru Iwaya
 Masao Kume
 Nakayama Gishu
 Teruhiko Mashiko
 Takumi Nemoto
Eisaku Satō (governor)
 Shinzo Shinjo
 Takayama Chogyū
 Toshio Tamogami
 Joji Yuasa

References 

Educational institutions established in 1884
High schools in Fukushima Prefecture
Education in Fukushima Prefecture
1884 establishments in Japan